Khwaja Muhammad Afzal (1875 – 1940) was an Urdu poet in East Bengal, British India.

Early life
In 1875, Afzal was born into the Dhaka Nawab family. His father was Khwaja Yusuf Jan. He received formal education in English and Persian. He studied poetry under Syed Mahmud Azad, a Dhaka-based poet.

Career
Afzal wrote poetry in Urdu and Persian and used Afzal as his pen name. He wrote a Diwan, which is an Islamic traditional collection of poetry, and a number of Ghazals in Urdu. He used the Abjad writing system to publish three volumes of  a history book. After the death of Khwaja Ahsanullah, he published the Gam-e-ma-paikar in the Abjad writing system. Between 1895 and 1933, he regularly kept a diary, which is now preserved in the library of the University of Dhaka.

References

1875 births
1940 deaths
People from Dhaka District
Members of the Dhaka Nawab family
Poets in British India
Urdu-language poets from India